Force and Determination is a far-right Hungarian nationalist political movement founded in 2017 in response to the Jobbik moving away from its radical right-wing roots and "staking out a more centrist position", according to The Guardian. Its leaders are László Balázs and Zsolt Tyirityán. According to Reuters, the movement openly advocates for racism against the Romani people, as well as Arab and African refugees, and has previously referenced ideologies promoted by the Nazi Party.

References

2017 establishments in Hungary
Far-right political parties in Hungary
Hungarian nationalism
Nationalist parties in Hungary
Political parties established in 2017
Right-wing populism in Hungary
Jobbik breakaway groups